Phi Capricorni (φ Cap, φ Capricorni) is a solitary star in the southern constellation of  Capricornus. It is visible to the naked eye with an apparent visual magnitude of +5.16. Based upon an annual parallax shift of 5.07 mas as seen from the Earth, the star is located about 640 light years from the Sun, give or take 30 light years.

This is an evolved, orange-hued K-type giant/bright giant star with a stellar classification of K0 II-III It shows an infrared excess, which may be due to leftover material from a mass-loss event. The star has an estimated 2.63 times the mass of the Sun, and radiates 447 times the solar luminosity from its photosphere at an effective temperature of 4,490 K. Phi Capricorni is around 1.24 billion years old and is spinning with a projected rotational velocity of 3.8 km/s.

Chinese Name
Consequently, the Chinese name for φ Capricorni itself represents the state Chu, together with ε Ophiuchi in Right Wall of Heavenly Market Enclosure (asterism).

R. H. Allen had opinion that φ Capricorni, together with χ Capricorni, represented the state Wei (魏).

References

K-type bright giants
Capricorni, Phi
Capricornus (constellation)
Durchmusterung objects
Capricorni, 28
202320
104963
8127